This article describes the current heritage railway.  For the historical railway see Llanelly and Mynydd Mawr Railway.

The Llanelli and Mynydd Mawr Railway is a heritage railway which aims to re-instate as much as possible of the former Llanelly and Mynydd Mawr Railway which closed in 1989.

History

The Llanelly and Mynydd Mawr Railway, earlier known as the Carmarthenshire Tramroad was established in 1802 in Wales by an Act of Parliament. It began running trains in 1803, the initial line being a plateway, with motive power provided by a pair of horses.  The Llanelly and Mynydd Mawr Railway is claimed to be the Oldest Public Railway in Britain.  Although the Surrey Iron Railway was the first to be incorporated, it is believed that the LMMR was the first to open to traffic.

The Carmarthenshire Tramroad closed in 1844 but the railway reopened in 1883 operated by the newly formed Llanelly and Mynydd Mawr Railway Co. That company disappeared in 1922 on being absorbed into the Great Western Railway, which itself was absorbed into British Railways in 1947. Throughout the twentieth century the line continued as a main artery for coal distribution from the Gwendraeth valley, until the closure of Cynheidre Colliery in 1989.

Llanelli and District Railway Society

Following a campaign lasting almost ten years from the Llanelli and District Railway Society (L&DRS) to save the intact, but derelict line the hopes were dashed in the mid 1990s when the railway was sold by British Rail property board to the local authorities as part of a scheme to transform the track bed into a cycle way. This path is now labelled as the Swiss Valley Cycle Route, part of National Cycle Route 47, itself a part of the Celtic Trail.

Llanelli and Mynydd Mawr Railway Company Limited

Whilst the L&DRS's efforts were thwarted, a new charitable company (Registered Charity No. 1087985) was incorporated on 13 August 2001. It is a non-profit making company limited by guarantee with no remuneration paid to its Directors. The company is named The Llanelli and Mynydd Mawr Railway Company Ltd, therefore reviving the name of the former operator albeit with the later Llanelli spelling. The primary objective of the registered charity is to reinstate a railway on the historic line. A heritage centre will also interpret the history of coal mining in the area and in particular the industry which the railway served.

The charity's scheme will utilise derelict land on the site of the former colliery which is now owned by the LMMR outright as of 2005. In the long-term the railway which closed to rail traffic in 1989 will be re-instated where possible. Work at the site at Cynheidre near Llanelli, South Wales is currently progressing at a steady pace. The first phase will include the placing of a loco shed on site as well as making the site available to the public. The primary objective is to achieve a running line of  consisting of a platform, loco shed, heritage centre, gift shop and café. As of September 2007 the loco shed had been fully constructed and this allowed for the rolling stock to be transported to the site on 19–22 November 2007.

The railway held its first public open day on Sunday 3 September 2017 which saw the railway operate brakevan rides using Sentinel 0-4-0DH shunter no. 10222 and BR Brakevan no 981287. The railway's buffet car was used for refreshments throughout the course of the day.

Rolling stock
The LMMR operates and in some cases owns the following rolling stock:

Steam
1498 Avonside Engine Company  named 'Desmond' Built 1906 - Currently located at the Flour Mill, Lydney pending restoration.

Diesel locomotives
No. 10222  Sentinel Waggon Works (Rolls-Royce) diesel shunter.

No. 08795  English Electric British Rail Class 08 diesel shunter (ex-Great Western Railway) - Currently located at Chrysalis Rail, Landore Depot.
No. 73130 Bo-Bo British Railways Class 73 Electro - Diesel locomotive (Ex European Passenger Services, Owned by 73130 Ltd)

Diesel Multiple Units
In addition to a British Rail Class 122 Bubble Car unit, the L&MMR is currently host to four Pacer DMUs:
 No. 55019 British Rail Class 122 Diesel Multiple Unit.
 No. 142006 British Rail Class 142 Diesel Multiple Unit.
 No. 143606 British Rail Class 143 Diesel Multiple Unit.
 No. 143607 British Rail Class 143 Diesel Multiple Unit.
 No. 143612 British Rail Class 143 Diesel Multiple Unit (Owned by the Vale of Berkeley Railway).

Electric Multiple Units
 No. 483006 British Rail Class 483 Electric Multiple Unit (Owned by the London Transport Traction Group).
 No. 483008 British Rail Class 483 Electric Multiple Unit (Owned by the London Transport Traction Group).
No. Class 315 856 British Rail Class 315 (Owned by the class 315 Preservation society.

Coaching Stock
No.1206 British Rail Mark 2 RFB 1st Class BR Buffet Car Built 1973.

Wagons

No.35377 GWR Toad Brake van
No.B 951287 BR Brakevan Brake van
No.48325 British Rail Tar Wagon (Circa 1939).
No.40225 British Rail Tar Wagon (Circa 1950).
No.40229 British Rail Tar Wagon (Circa 1950).
British Rail Tippler Wagon - Cut down to flat bed wagon.
No.2135 GWR Bloater Fish Van (Circa 1919).

References

Reading Material

 The Llanelly & Mynydd Mawr Railway - 1st Edition - 1992 by M.R.C. Price - Oakwood Press

External links
 The L&MMR official homepage
 WalesRails - L&MMR Page

Heritage railways in Carmarthenshire
Llanelli
Standard gauge railways in Wales